The University of Applied Sciences Utrecht (HU) is a science university in Utrecht, Netherlands.

Several student communities are present in the university. On April 19, 2021, it was announced that the Celsius student team won three awards in the Solar Decathlon Build Challenge held by United States Department of Energy.

References

 
Vocational universities in the Netherlands
Education in Utrecht (city)